Christine Mackinday, known professionally as Christy Mack, is an American nude model and former pornographic actress.

Career
Mackinday portrayed DC Comics character Zatanna in the 2012 porn parody The Dark Knight XXX.

In April 2013, Mackinday launched her official website with Puba, and in November, Fleshlight released Attack and Booty, her signature sex toys.

In a 2013 interview with Vice, Mackinday stated that she planned to retire from performing in adult videos once she had earned enough money to do so. In July 2014, she said she had not performed in a new scene in ten months. She confirmed her retirement in an April 2015 ESPN story.

In 2016, Mackinday launched a clothing line with the website Pornhub to raise money for domestic violence survivors, following her assault by her ex-boyfriend, mixed martial artist War Machine.

Personal life
Mackinday grew up in Edinburgh, Indiana, where she was a cheerleader. She married at the age of eighteen but later left her husband and moved to Miami to work in nude modeling.
She was later involved in a relationship with mixed martial artist Jonathan Koppenhaver, known as War Machine.

In August 2014, Mackinday and her boyfriend Corey Thomas were assaulted by Koppenhaver in her Las Vegas home. Mackinday sustained eighteen broken bones, a broken nose, missing teeth, a fractured rib, a ruptured liver, and a thigh bruise so deep she was unable to walk for at least a week. Mackinday says Koppenhaver also attempted to rape her, but was unable to maintain an erection. Koppenhaver was later arrested in Simi Valley by U.S. Marshals and Simi Valley police. Koppenhaver was found guilty of twenty-nine of the thirty-four charges against him, including sexual assault and kidnapping; in 2017, he was sentenced to life in prison with a possibility of parole after thirty-six years.

Awards and nominations

References

Further reading

External links

 
 
 
 

21st-century American actresses
Alt porn
American female adult models
Living people
Pornographic film actors from Indiana
1990s births